Jon Carin (born October 21, 1964) is a musician, singer, songwriter and producer. He has collaborated with acts including Pink Floyd, the Who, Eddie Vedder, Kate Bush and Richard Butler.

Biography
As a teenager, Jon Carin started his professional musical career with the band Industry as their lead singer, keyboardist and songwriter. During his time with the band, they had a hit single with "State of the Nation" in 1984, being followed by the album Stranger to Stranger.

In 1985, he was asked by Industry's producer, Rhett Davies, to work with Bryan Ferry for his Boys and Girls album. Later in 1985, he joined Bryan Ferry at Live Aid, where he first played with Pink Floyd guitarist David Gilmour.

The following year, Carin collaborated with Gilmour in the sessions for what would become Pink Floyd's album A Momentary Lapse of Reason (1987). He received credit as a keyboardist and for co-writing "Learning to Fly". He participated in the support tour for the album, performing alongside returning keyboardist Richard Wright, and appeared on the 1988 Pink Floyd double live album, Delicate Sound of Thunder. In 1992, Carin participated in the recording of the soundtrack for La Carrera Panamericana. Two years later, in 1994, Carin contributed keyboards to Pink Floyd's album The Division Bell (1994). He also participated on the Division Bell tour and was featured on the Pulse CD and DVD.

Carin performed with the Who, playing Quadrophenia in its entirety in 1996, at London's Hyde Park, which led to an extensive tour throughout much of 1996–97.

On August 16, 1998, he produced and played keyboards and drums for Pete Townshend for a concert to raise money for the Maryville Academy. In 1999, a CD of this concert was released, being produced by Carin.

Throughout the late 1990s and early 2000s, he was on tour with former Pink Floyd bassist, Roger Waters, for his In the Flesh tour. This makes him one of few musicians who has played with both Roger Waters and Pink Floyd after Waters' departure from the band.

This tour is documented on the DVD/CD Roger Waters In The Flesh, which features Jon as a lead vocalist.

In October 2001, he performed with the Who at The Concert for New York City, a tribute concert to the lives lost on September 11. In January 2002, a recording of the tribute was released on CD and DVD.

He performed keyboards, Lap Steel guitar & vocals with Pink Floyd at their reunion with Roger Waters on July 2, 2005, for Live 8 at Hyde Park.

In 2005, a three-disc DVD recording of the Who's 1996 performance of Quadrophenia was released.

Carin played with David Gilmour in the 2006 tour, in support of On an Island. From June 2006, he played on Roger Waters The Dark Side of the Moon Live tour, with dates in 2007 and 2008.

Carin has worked with such organizations as Amnesty International, Greenpeace, and 4 Seasons of Hope for fundraising events, playing with Seal, Elvis Costello, the Chieftains, Spinal Tap, and many others.

In 2006, Carin worked on the self-titled solo album by The Psychedelic Furs' frontman Richard Butler. He wrote, arranged and played all of the instrumental parts, as well as producing and engineering the album. The album was co-dedicated to Carin's late father and Butler's late father.

On 10 May 2007, Carin was one of the performers at the Syd Barrett tribute concert, "Madcap's Last Laugh", at the Barbican Centre in London, performing with Roger Waters and - separately - the members of Pink Floyd (billed as Rick Wright, David Gilmour and Nick Mason) as well as with Captain Sensible. Two months later, Carin performed on keyboards, guitar and lead vocals with Roger Waters at the Live Earth event on 7 July 2007, at Giants Stadium in New Jersey.

He has also programmed the sounds for The Rascals reunion shows in Port Chester, New York, the Capitol Theatre in December 2012.

Carin performed with Roger Waters and Eddie Vedder for the "12/12/12" Hurricane Sandy benefit concert.

He performed with Roger Waters tour "The Wall 2010–2013 Live" on keyboards, guitars, lap steel, and programming.

In 2014, Carin performed in Kate Bush's Before the Dawn concert series at Hammersmith Apollo, her first live shows in 35 years.

He then contributed to David Gilmour’s Rattle That Lock album, playing keyboards in 2015.

Carin performed with David Gilmour on his Rattle That Lock World Tour 2015–16.

In Autumn 2016, he performed with Roger Waters on a short tour of Mexico, then at Desert Trip in Coachella.

In 2018, completed the 157-show Us + Them Tour with Roger Waters.

Jon is currently on tour with Roger Waters' in 2022 and 2023 on his This Is Not a Drill tour.

Selected discography

Industry
 State of the Nation (EP) 
 Stranger to Stranger

Pink Floyd
 A Momentary Lapse of Reason
 Learning to Fly
 Delicate Sound of Thunder
 Knebworth '90
 La Carrera Panamericana (soundtrack for the film)
 Shine On
 The Division Bell
 Pulse
 Echoes: The Best of Pink Floyd
 Oh, By The Way
 The Best of Pink Floyd: A Foot in the Door 
 The Division Bell 20th Anniversary Box Set
 The Endless River
 The Later Years 1987–2019
 Live At Knebworth 1990

Roger Waters
 In the Flesh Live
 Flickering Flame: The Solo Years Vol. 1
 Live Earth
 12-12-12: The Concert for Sandy Relief
 Roger Waters: The Wall
 Roger Waters: Us + Them
 The Lockdown Sessions (2022)

David Gilmour
 On an Island (Bonus DVD with AOL Sessions and Albert Hall footage)
 Remember That Night: Live at Royal Albert Hall (DVD)
 Live in Gdańsk
 Rattle That Lock
 Live at Pompeii

The Who
The Concert for New York City [Disc 2, tracks 2–4] (2001)
Amazing Journey: The Story of The Who [Track 14] (2008)
Tommy and Quadrophenia Live

Pete Townshend
 A Benefit for Maryville Academy
 Lifehouse

Kate Bush
Before the Dawn (Kate Bush concert series)

Richard Butler
 Richard Butler

Trashmonk
 Mona Lisa Overdrive

Dream Academy
 A Different Kind of Weather
 Somewhere in the Sun... Best of the Dream Academy

Martha Wainwright
 Martha Wainwright

Bryan Ferry
 Boys and Girls
 Live Aid
 More Than This: The Best of Bryan Ferry & Roxy Music

Soul Asylum
 Candy from a Stranger
 Black Gold: The Best of Soul Asylum

The Psychedelic Furs
 Midnight to Midnight
 Pretty in Pink
 All of This and Nothing
 Made of Rain

Gipsy Kings
 Compas

Live
 Secret Samadhi 

David Broza
 Night Dawn, The Unpublished Poetry of Townes Van Zandt

Fields of the Nephilim
 Elizium

Kashmir
 The Good Life

Peter Perrett
 How The West Was Won

Corey Feldman
 Angelic 2 the Core

References

External links

 Brain Damage UK Interview August 2007 by Arash Danesh

1964 births
21st-century American keyboardists
Living people
American rock keyboardists
American multi-instrumentalists
American new wave musicians
American rock guitarists
American rock singers
American male singers
People from Nassau County, New York
Songwriters from New York (state)
Synth-pop new wave musicians
Male new wave singers
Musicians from New York City
Pink Floyd
David Gilmour
Roger Waters
20th-century American guitarists
21st-century American guitarists
American male guitarists